is a Japanese male illustrator and adult game artist from Tokyo. He illustrated the manga adaptations to two visual novels developed by Moonstone: Gift, and Clear. His seinen manga Musashino-sen no Shimai has been made into a live action film. It premiered in Japanese theaters on November 17 of 2012. Yukiwo is also the illustrator of the light novel Noucome.
His manga Dropkick on My Devil! received an anime adaptation in 2018.

Works

Artbook
 nouvelle vague - published by Core Magazine

Manga

Original
 Dropkick on My Devil! - 2012
 JJ Doctor with T - 2015
 Marika-chan Otsu - 2010
 Musashino-sen no Shimai - 2007
 Oyoshi ni Natte! Ranmaru-san - 2012
 Uchū Pharaoh ☆ Patra-chan - 2014

Adaptation
 Clear: Itsuka Tatta Ano Oka de... - 2007 (Moonstone)
 Gift ~under the rainbow~ - 2006 (Moonstone) 
 Tayutama: Kiss on my Deity - 2009 (Lump of Sugar)

Visual novels
 Hyper→Highspeed→Genius - 2011 (Windmill)
 Gemini - 2004 (Moonstone)
 Kizumono no Gakuen 3: Heaven's Door - 2007 (Rasen)
 RPG Gakuen (guest artist) - 2010 (Circus)

Light novels
 Noucome - 2012

References

External links
Yukiwo's personal website 
Yukiwo at Pixiv 
 

Manga artists from Tokyo
Living people
Year of birth missing (living people)